The 1978–79 Vancouver Canucks season was the team's ninth in the National Hockey League.

Offseason

Regular season

Final standings

Schedule and results

Playoffs

Player statistics

Awards and records

Transactions

Draft picks
Vancouver's draft picks at the 1978 NHL Amateur Draft held at the Queen Elizabeth Hotel in Montreal, Quebec.

Farm teams

See also
1978–79 NHL season

References

External links

Vancouver Canucks seasons
Vancouver C
Vancouver